Ping Khong is a tambon (subdistrict) of Chiang Dao District, in Chiang Mai Province, Thailand. In 2020 it had a total population of 14,007 people.

History
The subdistrict was created effective August 1, 1979 by splitting off 5 administrative villages from Mueang Ngai.

Administration

Central administration
The tambon is subdivided into 16 administrative villages (muban).

Local administration
The whole area of the subdistrict is covered by the subdistrict municipality (Thesaban Tambon) Ping Khong (เทศบาลตำบลปิงโค้ง).

References

External links
Thaitambon.com on Ping Khong

Tambon of Chiang Mai province
Populated places in Chiang Mai province